Amplypterus panopus, the mango hawkmoth, is a moth of the family Sphingidae. The species was first described by Pieter Cramer in 1779. It is found in Sri Lanka, southern and northern India (including the Andaman Islands and Nicobar Islands), Nepal, Myanmar, southern China, Thailand, Vietnam, Laos, Indonesia (to Sulawesi) and the Philippines.

Description 
The wingspan is 130–168 mm.

Biology 
Adults are on wing in March, April, June, August and December in Hong Kong.

Larvae have been recorded on Dracontomelum, Mangifera indica, Rhus, Durio, Calophyllum and Garcinia.

In The Fauna of British India, Including Ceylon and Burma: Moths Volume I, the species is described as follows:

Subspecies
Amplypterus panopus panopus
Amplypterus panopus hainanensis Eitschberger, 2006 (Hainan)

References

Amplypterus
Moths described in 1779
Moths of Asia